The men's pole vault event at the 1988 World Junior Championships in Athletics was held in Sudbury, Ontario, Canada, at Laurentian University Stadium on 27 and 28 July.

Medalists

Results

Final
28 July

Qualifications
27 Jul

Group A

Group B

Participation
According to an unofficial count, 18 athletes from 14 countries participated in the event.

References

Pole vault
Pole vault at the World Athletics U20 Championships